Thuzar is a 1940 Burmese black-and-white drama film directed by Chan Tun starring Ba Tint, Khin Maung Yin and Khin Khin Yee.

Cast
Ba Tint as Ba Tint
Khin Maung Yin as Khin Maung Yin
Khin Khin Yee as Khin Khin Yee

References

External links
 http://www.modins.net/Entertainment/filmstar/ancient_image01.htm#actress

1940 films
Burmese black-and-white films